Nishu Nursery and Kothari Convent is a school in Akola, in the Vidarbha region of the state of Maharashtra, central India. Located in the area of Laxmi Nagar, it is affiliated with Amravati University.

The school was founded in 1984–85, with classes originally taking place behind the Jamanlal Goenka Dental College. It is run by a group of trustees and its staff is currently headed by Kadlaskar Madam.

Schools in Maharashtra
Education in Akola